Podul may refer to:

Podul Grant, bridge for motorway and lightrail in Bucharest, Romania
Podul Lung, a village in Sipoteni village, Călăraşi district, Moldova
Podul Popii, tributary of the river Bașeu in Romania
Podu (disambiguation), several places in Romania
Typhoon Podul (disambiguation) used to name two tropical cyclones in the northwestern Pacific Ocean